The Kimbrough-Hehr House, on U.S. 62 in Broadwell, Kentucky, was built around 1840.  It was listed on the National Register of Historic Places in 1979.  The listing included five contributing buildings.

The house is a two-story five-bay Greek Revival-style brick house, joined by a roofed open passageway to a two-story building which originally served as a kitchen with servant quarters above.  Nearby are a one-story slave quarters and a smokehouse.  The historic Broadwell Store, built c.1820, is also on the property.

References

National Register of Historic Places in Harrison County, Kentucky
Greek Revival architecture in Kentucky
Houses completed in 1820
Slave cabins and quarters in the United States
Houses in Harrison County, Kentucky
1820 establishments in Kentucky
Houses on the National Register of Historic Places in Kentucky
African-American history of Kentucky